Believe is the seventh studio album released by the group Celtic Woman.

The album was released in two versions: the first a compilation of earlier songs packaged with a new song, "Princess Toyotomi", released on 25 May 2011 in Japan to promote the release of the titular film in which said track served as the theme song, the other a studio album released internationally on 24 January 2012, featuring new music. Vocalists Chloë Agnew, Lisa Kelly, Lisa Lambe, and fiddler Máiréad Nesbitt appear on both versions, while the Japanese version features former members Órla Fallon, Lynn Hilary, Méav Ní Mhaolchatha, Alex Sharpe, and Hayley Westenra.

Track listing

International version

Japanese version

PBS special and DVD release background
A concert special of the same title was recorded live at the Fox Theater in Atlanta, Georgia, United States on 6 and 7 September 2011 to promote and accompany the international release of the album. The concert featured lead vocalists Chloë Agnew, Lisa Kelly, Lisa Lambe and fiddler Máiréad Nesbitt with the Aontas Choral Ensemble and the Celtic Woman band and orchestra led by musical director and pianist David Downes, as well as the Atlanta Pipe Band and the Gwinnett Young Singers. The concert was broadcast on PBS stations across the United States in December 2011 and released on DVD in March 2012.

DVD track listing

Personnel
Note: For international version only.

Per the liner notes:
Featured performers
Celtic Woman
 Chloë Agnew – vocals
 Lisa Kelly – vocals
 Lisa Lambe – vocals
 Máiréad Nesbitt – fiddle
Other performers
 Bagad de Lann-Bihoué
 Gwinnett Young Singers
Band
 Ewan Cowley – electric and acoustic guitar, bouzouki
 Eoghan O'Neill – bass guitar
 Tommy Martin – uilleann pipes, whistles
 Ray Fean – drums, percussion, bodhrán
 Anthony Byrne – bagpipes
 Andrew Boland – contra pièna-flörten
 David Downes – grand piano, keyboards, whistles, percussion, backing vocals
The Irish Film Orchestra
 Caitríona Walsh – orchestra contractor
 David Downes – conductor, orchestrations, choral arrangements
 Alan Smale – concertmaster
 Martin Johnston – solo cello
 Gerald Peregrine – solo cello
 Nick Ingham – additional orchestrations
Aontas Choral Ensemble
 Rosemary Collier – choral director
Production
 Produced and arranged by David Downes
 Engineered and mixed by Andrew Boland
 Additional engineering by David Downes
 Recorded at Windmill Lane Studio 1 and RTÉ STUDIOTWO, Dublin, Ireland
 Mixed at STUDIOTWO, Dublin, Ireland
 Mastered by Vlado Meller at Masterdisk, New York, United States

Charts
Note: For international version only.

Certifications

References

Celtic Woman albums
2011 albums
Manhattan Records albums